Yuri Ivanovich Chesnokov (25 January 1952 – 20 November 1999) was a Soviet football player.

Honours
 Grigory Fedotov Club member.

International career
Chesnokov made his debut for USSR on 28 November 1976 in a friendly against Argentina. He played in UEFA Euro 1980 qualifiers (USSR did not qualify for the final tournament).

External links
  Profile

1952 births
1999 deaths
People from Kimry
Russian footballers
Soviet footballers
Soviet Union international footballers
Soviet Top League players
FC Lokomotiv Moscow players
PFC CSKA Moscow players

Association football forwards
Sportspeople from Tver Oblast